Joldagiroceras is a genus of orthocerids that lived during the Late Silurian, Ludlovian stage.  Othoderids are nautiloid cephalopods characterized generally by long straight shells with narrow central siphuncles.

References

 Jack Sepkoski's list of cephalopod genera  

Prehistoric nautiloid genera
Silurian cephalopods